OpenTable is an online restaurant-reservation service company founded by Sid Gorham, Eric Moe and Chuck Templeton on 2 July 1998 and is based in San Francisco, California.

In 1998, operations began with a limited selection of restaurants in San Francisco. Restaurants used the company's back-end software to process the reservations made on the website, resulting in a real-time reservation system for both diners and restaurants. The service has since expanded to cover more than 50,000 restaurants in more than 80 countries. 

Reservations are free to end users; the company charges restaurants flat monthly and per-reservation fees for their use of the system. According to the company, it provides online reservations for more than 50,000 restaurants around the world and seats over 1 billion diners per year.

On June 13, 2014, the company announced it had agreed to terms with the Priceline Group (now Booking Holdings, Inc.) to be acquired in an all-cash deal for $2.6 billion.

History 
OpenTable was founded by Chuck Templeton on 2 July 1998, and initially incorporated in California as easyeats.com, Inc.

On 21 May 2009, the company held its initial public offering (IPO), on the NASDAQ stock exchange under the ticker symbol . The underwriters of the IPO were Merrill Lynch, Allen & Company, Stifel Nicolaus, and ThinkEquity.

On 1 October 2010, the company acquired Toptable, a restaurant reservation site in the UK.

On 29 January 2013, the company announced that it had entered a definitive agreement to acquire Foodspotting.

On 13 June 2014 the company agreed to a takeover offer by the Priceline Group of $103 a share, a 46% premium on the previous day's closing stock price. The offer valued the company at $2.6 billion. Both companies said OpenTable would continue to operate as a separate business under the same management.

In August 2020, OpenTable named Debby Soo as its new CEO. OpenTable And CLEAR Partner to Help Restaurants Streamline Proof Of Vaccination Requirements Across The US。

Information

For users 
Users search for restaurants and reservations based on such parameters as dates, times, cuisine, and price range. Users who have registered their email address with the system will then receive a confirmation email.  Users can also receive 100 or 1,000 points after dining that can be redeemed for discounts at member restaurants.

The company also has a mobile application that allows users to find and book dinner reservations.

For restaurants 
Restaurant owners use an Electronic Reservation Book which computerizes restaurant host-stand operations and replaces existing paper reservation systems. The system handles reservation management, table management, guest recognition, and email marketing.

See also 
 List of companies based in San Francisco
 List of websites about food and drink

References 

1998 establishments in California
Companies based in San Francisco
Internet properties established in 1998
Companies formerly listed on the Nasdaq
Online retailers of the United States
Restaurant guides
WatchOS software
Android (operating system) software
Booking Holdings
2009 initial public offerings
2014 mergers and acquisitions
American corporate subsidiaries